Ilia Abuladze (November 24, 1901 – October 9, 1968) was a distinguished Georgian historian, philologist and public figure, a Corresponding Member of the Georgian Academy of Sciences (GAS) (1950), Meritorious Science Worker of Georgia (1961), Doctor of Philological Sciences (1938), and professor (1947).

Abuladze was born in a small village in Imereti (Western Georgia). In 1927 he graduated from the Tbilisi State University (TSU) and engaged in academic work in 1932. He was a scholar specializing in the history of old Georgian literature and the Armeno-Georgian literary and cultural relations. He is also renowned for having rediscovered the lost alphabet of Caucasian Albanians.

In 1950 Abuladze was elected a Corresponding Member of the Georgian Academy of Sciences. In 1958 he organized the Institute of Manuscripts of the GAS (now the Georgian National Center of Manuscripts) and became its lifelong director. From 1938 to 1968 Abuladze was a professor of the Tbilisi State University.

Abuladze published critical editions of all major Georgian hagiographical works in the monumental series of Works of Old Georgian Hagiographical Literature (ძველი ქართული აგიოგრაფიული ლიტერატურის ძეგლები). Having taken a special interest in Armenian sources, he edited the medieval Armenian adaptation of the Georgian Chronicles. He also discovered and studied the ancient Old Udi script (1937) and compiled Dictionary of the Old Georgian Language (ძველი ქართული ენის ლექსიკონი; appeared posthumously in 1973).

See also 
 List of Georgians

References 

1901 births
1968 deaths
20th-century historians from Georgia (country)
Philologists from Georgia (country)
Lexicographers from Georgia (country)
Academic staff of Tbilisi State University
Udi language
Soviet philologists
Soviet lexicographers
Honoured Scientists of Georgia (country)
Corresponding Members of the Georgian National Academy of Sciences
Soviet historians